Joseph Brian "Joe" Amlong (December 17, 1936 – July 1, 2019) was an American competition rower who often teamed with his brother Tom. In 1964 they won the national title in coxless pairs and an Olympic gold medal in the eights. Next year Joe won a bronze medal in the eights at the European championships.

Amlong was born at a military base in Haines, Alaska, to Colonel Ransom George Amlong and Marguerite Kennedy. He had a sister Mary Diane and four brothers: John Michael, Ransom Jerome, Thomas Kennedy and William. In 1946 the family moved to Huntley Meadows Park in Fairfax County, Virginia, and lived there until 1950, when Colonel Amlong was transferred to Belgium. In 1953 Amlong Sr. retired, and the family returned to Huntley.

Amlong took up rowing in Liège, Belgium, in 1951, together with Tom. Later in 1951 they moved to Germany and competed there in coxless pairs in 1952. The brothers became quickly known for their power, rude characters and lack of communication skills. In August 1954 they enlisted to the 82nd Airborne Division. Next year they successfully applied to an Army sports program, and were transferred to Washington, to prepare for the 1956 Olympics at the Potomac River. They were defeated at the 1956 Olympic Trials, and the same year Joe enrolled to the United States Military Academy, graduating in 1961. Later in 1961 Joe and Tom joined the Vesper Boat Club in Philadelphia.

As most of his brothers, Amlong followed his father and had a long military career, retiring as a U.S. Air Force captain after 20 years of service. This career was hampered by rowing, and he did not advance in ranks after the 1964 Games, same as his brother Tom. On August 12, 1963 Joseph married Gail Moon and had three daughters with her. They lived in a remote place at Grand Cole, Montana, and then moved to Vero Beach, Florida.

References

Cited sources

1936 births
2019 deaths
Rowers at the 1964 Summer Olympics
Olympic gold medalists for the United States in rowing
American male rowers
Medalists at the 1964 Summer Olympics
People from Haines Borough, Alaska
European Rowing Championships medalists